Wahroonga Public School is a public school located in Wahroonga, New South Wales and is known as "The Bush School".

History 
The school opened in 1944 when parental groups brought the need for a school in the area to the attention of council members and other community groups.  It is the only primary school in Sydney with 2 swimming pools. When the school first opened, it had 11 students, and one teacher/principal. The school celebrated its 60th birthday in 2004. The school continues to grow. In 2007, the school was one of the few schools in the state to increase enrolments. In 2018, they are celebrating the school's 75th birthday.

Over the years, Wahroonga Public School gained many more pupils, increasing to over 700 students in the mid-1990s.  The number has fallen to just above 700 students in recent times.
Jenny Ryan was appointed as principal in 1997 and eventually left the school in 2003, continuing her career at another school. During her time as principal, she was awarded the "State Government Community Service Award". Graham Hill was principal from 2004 to mid-2010, succeeded by John Benton. The vice-principal is Leonie Hibbert and searching for new vice principal, and the substitute vice-principal, in case of absence of both principals mentioned above, is Jennifer Flynn. Each year, the school appoints 10 student leaders. Five boys and five girls lead the school while participating in extra jobs to ensure day-to-day life around the school runs smoothly. Two school captains, two vice-captains and three prefects of both genders take on these roles. Hill made the news in 2004 when he "auctioned" his parking space at the school to raise much needed money for blinds, vents and roof insulation for the kindergarten classrooms at the school.

In 2006, the school's new sports grounds was opened by the Australian Defence minister Brendan Nelson. In the same year, the school community raised over $8000 towards a life saving operation for a kindergarten pupil who attended the school. The toddler also appeared on the "Today" television show to raise more money for the operation.

Extracurricular opportunities 
The school has five bands. These have won prizes at competitions such as the Yamaha Music Festival. There is a football team. It is one of the few public schools in New South Wales to have a swimming program, which runs over the summer holidays. Swimming lessons are also provided to year 1-6 students.

References

Public primary schools in Sydney
School buildings completed in 1944
Educational institutions established in 1944
1944 establishments in Australia
Wahroonga, New South Wales